Edward Ashton White Fuller (March 22, 1869 – March 15, 1935) was a major league baseball player for the 1886 Washington Nationals. He was born in Washington, D.C., on March 22, 1868, and died on March 16, 1935, in Hyattsville, Maryland.  He was right-handed for both batting and throwing. He was 6'0" and weighed 158 lbs. He played his first game on July 17, 1886, for the Nationals when he was only eighteen years of age. Five days later he played his final major league baseball game for the Nationals on July 22, 1886.

External links

Washington Nationals (1886–1889) players
1868 births
1935 deaths
19th-century baseball players
Newark Domestics players
Hartford Babies players
Hartford Dark Blues (minor league) players
Syracuse Stars (minor league baseball) players
Newark Little Giants players
Canandaigua (minor league baseball) players
Buffalo Bisons (minor league) players
Wilmington Blue Hens players
Baseball players from Washington, D.C.